Rugby union is a minor, but growing, sport in Denmark.

The Danish Rugby Union dates back to 1950, and joined the IRB in 1988. They joined the Scandinavian Rugby Union in 1974.

History
Denmark is normally considered the second nation in Nordic rugby, after Sweden. Until 1980, they had never beaten Sweden, but since then,
the silverware has been shared fairly equal, and in 1995 beat the touring side of Welsh Districts.

Rugby has been played in Denmark since 1931.

Levels of development in Denmark in the 1970s, were extremely uneven. For example, in 1973, when Comet met Lyndo in a match in Copenhagen, the scoreline was 194-0.

The Danes have a fairly robust amateur struction, which comprises over thirty clubs, and 3,000 registered players.

See also 
 Denmark national rugby union team
 Denmark women's national rugby union team

External links
 World Rugby Denmark page
 Official union page
 Denmark Rugby news
 (Danish) Aktuelle resultater i forbundets øverste puljer. (Rugby)
 Archives du Rugby: Danemark

References 
 Cotton, Fran (Ed.) (1984) The Book of Rugby Disasters & Bizarre Records. Compiled by Chris Rhys. London. Century Publishing. 
 Richards, Huw A Game for Hooligans: The History of Rugby Union (Mainstream Publishing, Edinburgh, 2007)